The Constitutional Council is a collective body of constitutional jurisdiction in Kazakhstan.

Structure
The Constitutional Council consists of seven members. The Chairman and two members of the council are appointed by the President and two members each by the Senate and the Mazhilis. Members serve for terms of six years. In addition to the appointed members, any former Presidents of Kazakhstan are lifetime members of the Constitutional Council.

The current chairman is Kairat Mami.

The Council was established by the 1995 Constitution which replaced the Constitutional Court of Kazakhstan. The decision of the Constitutional Council in whole or in part may be objected to by the President, which can be overturned by two-thirds of the votes of the total number of members of the Constitutional Council. According to the amendments made to the 2017 Constitution, the right of the president's objection is canceled.

Only the President, Chairman of the Senate, Chairman of the Mazhilis, at least one fifth of the total number of deputies of the Parliament, the Prime Minister are allowed to appeal to the Council, as well as the lower courts in a case of infringement of human rights and freedoms and citizen normative legal acts.

Jurisdiction
The Constitutional Council considers all decisions made and laws passed by the Mazhilis, as well as international treaties to ensure they are compliant with the constitution. Rulings on new laws are made prior to them being signed by the president.

The court also rules on election disputes.

Powers 

 verify the correctness of the elections of the President of the Republic, deputies of parliament and the conducting of republican referendum
verify the compliance of the Constitution of laws adopted by the Parliament prior to their signing by the President
verify the compliance of the Constitution of decisions taken by the Parliament and its chambers
verify the compliance of the Constitution of International Contracts before their ratification
give the official interpretation of the norms of the Constitution
give conclusions when adopting amendments to the Constitution.

References

Government of Kazakhstan
Judiciary of Kazakhstan
Kazakhstan
Constitutional law
Kazakhstan
Courts and tribunals established in 1995
1995 establishments in Kazakhstan